Waldemar Sierański (born 5 April 1958 in Warszawa) - is Polish cabaret artist and actor. He is member of cabaret Koń Polski.

Filmography 

 1999: Badziewiakowie
 2000: Skarb sekretarza
 2002: Jest sprawa...

External links 
 Waldemar Sierański at Filmweb
 Waldemar Sierański at filmpolski.pl
 

Living people
1958 births
Polish male actors